Willie Clarence Young Jr. (July 12, 1912 – August 8, 2002) was an American Negro league pitcher for the Birmingham Black Barons in 1945.

A native of Birmingham, Alabama, Young was born without a right hand. He died in Birmingham in 2002 at age 90.

References

External links
 and Seamheads
 Willie Young at Negro Leagues Baseball Museum

1912 births
2002 deaths
Birmingham Black Barons players
Baseball pitchers
Baseball players from Birmingham, Alabama
20th-century African-American sportspeople
21st-century African-American people